Laid Black is a studio album by American recording artist Marcus Miller. It was released on June 1, 2018 by Blue Note Records. Laid Black was nominated for Best Contemporary Instrumental Album at the 61st Annual Grammy Awards. The album features collaborations with Trombone Shorty, Jonathan Butler, Take 6, Selah Sue, Kirk Whalum & Alex Han.

The track "Keep 'Em Runnin" is based on "Runnin" from Earth, Wind & Fire's 1977 album "All 'n All". Miller's arrangement plays the original melody over a half-tempo hip hop beat and adds a rap.

Reception
Michelle Mercer of DownBeat wrote, "There’s no judging an album by its cover. But the cover of Marcus Miller’s Laid Black is a litmus test: The title’s pun, the image of a shirtless Miller gazing with soulful directness and the musician’s reputation itself will divide most listeners into believers and doubters before they’ve even heard the first bass slap." Dan Bilawski of JazzTimes stated, "In liberally mixing aspects of R&B, trap, funk, and hip-hop with jazz, Miller manages to play up their commonalities while leveraging the originality and accessibility of each."

Track listing 
All songs written by Marcus Miller, except where noted.

Personnel 

Marcus Miller  – vocals, electric bass, bass clarinet
 Selah Sue – vocals
 Trombone Shorty – trombone
 Alex Bailey – percussion
 Jonathan Butler – vocals, guitar
 Alex Han – alto saxophone
 Kirk Whalum – flute, tenor saxophone
 Take 6 – vocals
 Louis Cato – vocals, drums
 Honey Larochelle – vocals
 Julian Miler – vocals
 Charles Haynes – drums
 Adam Agati – guitar
 Brian Culbertson – trombone
 Cliff Barnes – piano
 Russell Gunn – trumpet
 Marquis Hill – trumpet
 Patches Stewart – trumpet
 Mitch Henry – keyboards
 Brett Williams – keyboards

Technical Personnel 

 Aleks Edmonds – engineer
 Chris Allen – engineer
 Feri Bong – engineer, mixing
 Ron Boustead – mastering
 Jan de Ryck – vocal engineer
 Colin Fleming – engineer
 Jeff Gartenbaum – engineer
 Julian Miller – engineer
 David Rideau – mixing
 Jason Shavey – engineer
 Charles Smith – engineer
 Justin Tocket – engineer

References

External links
 

2018 albums
Marcus Miller albums
Albums produced by Marcus Miller
Concept albums
Blue Note Records albums